Sister 2 Sister was a monthly U.S. four-color women's magazine devoted to the world of African-American entertainment. It was in circulation between 1988 and 2014.

History and profile
Sister 2 Sister was established in 1988. Jamie Foster Brown was the founder and publisher. In October 2014 the magazine ceased publication and went online. It has since gone offline.

References

External links
Official website

African-American magazines
Monthly magazines published in the United States
Defunct women's magazines published in the United States
Entertainment magazines published in the United States
Magazines established in 1988
Magazines disestablished in 2014
Magazines published in Washington, D.C.
Online magazines with defunct print editions